Ken Wayne (1925–1993) was an Australian actor of radio, theatre, film and television. He made his film debut in Sons of Matthew (1949) and appeared in a number of movies including Dust in the Sun (1958). He was also well known for his work in radio, particularly for playing private eye Larry Kent in the series I Hate Crime. According to colleague and friend Charles Tingwell, being so identified with Larry Kent hurt Wayne from being cast in other roles.

He worked for 13 years in London but returned to Australia in 1972.

Selected filmography

Sons of Matthew (1950) - Barney O'Riordan
The Adventures of Long John Silver (1955) - guest star
Three in One (1957) - First Cab Driver (segment "The City") 
Dust in the Sun (1958) - Justin Bayard
The Multi-Coloured Umbrella (1958)
Double Cross (1958) (short)
On the Beach (1959) - Lt. Benson
One Step Beyond - "The Stranger" (1961) ... Guard
The Guns of Navarone (1961) - Soldier (uncredited)
Armchair Theatre (1961)
Reunion Day (1962)
The Saint - "The Element of Doubt" (1962)
Solo for Sparrow (1962) - Baker
Two and Two Make Six (1962) - Maj. Calhoun
Richard the Lionheart - Guardian of the Temple (1963)
The Plane Makers - Any More for the Skylark? (1963
No Hiding Place - Four Faces of Clare (1963) .
ITV Play of the Week
On the Run (1963) - Bryce
The Small World of Sammy Lee (1963) - Barman
Dixon of Dock Green (1964)
The Liquidator (1965) - Tank Crewman (uncredited)
The Wednesday Play (1965)
Up from the Beach (1965) - Pfc. Solly
The Dirty Dozen (1967) - Sgt. Fredericks (uncredited)
Nobody Runs Forever (1968) - Ferguson
Mogul - Who Did You Say Inherits the Earth? (1970) .
ITV Sunday Night Theatre - Lay Down Your Arms (1970)
Boney (1972)
The Adventurer (1973)
Division 4 - voice of the Gun (1973)
The Mackintosh Man (1973) - (uncredited)
Serpent in the Rainbow (1973)
Homicide TV series
That Certain Woman (1975)
Matlock Police (1975)
Lindsay's Boy (1974)
Silent Number (1976) TV series
The Professional Touch (1976)
The Bushranger (1976)
Power without Glory (1976) (TV series)
Alibis (1977) - Harry
Father Dear Father in Australia (1978)
Cop Shop (1978)
Doctor Down Under (1979)
Punishment (1981)
A Country Practice (1982)
Deadline (1982)
Brothers (1982)
Sherlock Holmes and a Study in Scarlet (1983) - voice
The Dismissal (1984)
A Tale of Two Cities (1984) - voice
Special Squad (1984)
Death of a Soldier (1986) - Law Member
Charley's Web (1986)
Rafferty's Rules (1998)
The Punisher (1989) - Bartender
GP (1992) (TV series)

Theatre Credits
These Positions Vacant, Independent Theatre July 1945
Get a Load of This, Tivoli Theatre 1945
Ah, Wilderness!, Minerva Theatre, Kings Cross 1948
Curly on the Rack, Elizabethan Theatre 1958
That Championship Season, Parade Theatre 1974

References

External links
Ken Wayne at National Film and Sound Archive

Cuttings on Ken Wayne at National Library of Australia
Australian theatre credits at AusStage

1925 births
1993 deaths
Male actors from Sydney
20th-century Australian male actors
Australian male film actors
Australian male radio actors